George Alfred O'Connor (28 March 1892 – 23 September 1921) was an Australian rules footballer who played with Richmond and St Kilda in the Victorian Football League (VFL).

Notes

External links 

1892 births
1921 deaths
Australian rules footballers from Victoria (Australia)
Richmond Football Club players
St Kilda Football Club players